The 2010 Totesport.com Welsh Open was a professional ranking snooker tournament that took place between 25 and 31 January 2010 at the Newport Centre in Newport, Wales. This was the first time that the Welsh Open was sponsored by Totesport.com.

John Higgins won in the final 9–4 against defending champion Ali Carter.

Prize fund
The breakdown of prize money for this year is shown below:

Winner: £35,000
Runner-up: £17,500
Semi-final: £8,750
Quarter-final: £6,500
Last 16: £4,275
Last 32: £2,700
Last 48: £1,725
Last 64: £1,325

Stage one highest break: £500
Stage two highest break: £2,000
Stage one maximum break: £1,000
Stage two maximum break: £20,000
Total: £225,500

Main draw

Final

Qualifying
These matches took place between 19 and 22 January 2010 at the Pontin's Centre, Prestatyn, Wales.

Century breaks

Qualifying stage centuries

 143  Craig Steadman
 138  Li Hang
 133  Liu Song
 127  Judd Trump
 125  Stephen Rowlings
 125  Fergal O'Brien
 123  Jimmy White
 119  Dominic Dale
 119  Tony Drago
 115  Sam Baird

 110  Tom Ford
 110  Stuart Bingham
 106, 103  Matthew Selt
 106  Ken Doherty
 105  Paul Davies
 103  Alan McManus
 102  David Gilbert
 102  Jamie Cope
 101  Mark Davis

Televised stage centuries

 138, 137, 109, 105, 101  John Higgins
 134  Ding Junhui
 129  Neil Robertson
 129  Joe Perry
 123  Jamie Cope
 122  Andrew Higginson
 122  Ronnie O'Sullivan

 120, 115  Ali Carter
 115  Mark Selby
 113  Stephen Hendry
 112, 102  Mark Williams
 109, 106  Matthew Stevens
 105  Marco Fu
 102  Fergal O'Brien

References

2010
Welsh Open
Open (snooker)
Welsh Open snooker in Newport
January 2010 sports events in the United Kingdom